Canada national soccer team may refer to:
Canada men's national soccer team
Canada men's national under-23 soccer team, Canada's Olympic men's soccer team
Canada men's national under-20 soccer team
Canada men's national under-17 soccer team
Canada women's national soccer team
Canada women's national under-20 soccer team
Canada women's national under-17 soccer team

See also
 Canada national beach soccer team
 Canada national football team (disambiguation)
 Canadian national team (disambiguation)